Dancing Point is a historic property on the north bank of the James River in rural Charles City County, Virginia.  Located off Sandy Point Road and projecting into the river, the property has archaeological sites dating to the early colonial period of Virginia's history that may shed light on the interaction between the early settlers of nearby Jamestown and the surrounding Native American communities; it is known to the be site of the 1619 Smith's Hundred settlement.  The property is more recently notable for a Post-Modern landscape design by Thomas Church, executed in the 1970s, that is believed to be his only surviving commission in the state.  A house from the same period was designed by Robert W. Stewart.

The property was added to the National Register of Historic Places in 2016.

See also
National Register of Historic Places listings in Charles City County, Virginia

References 

Houses on the National Register of Historic Places in Virginia
Houses completed in 1976
Houses in Charles City County, Virginia
National Register of Historic Places in Charles City County, Virginia
Historic districts in Virginia